Bowls Victoria, established in 1880 is the governing body for the sport of bowls in the State of Victoria. In addition to its specific responsibility for governing the sport and the development of the game at all levels, it also has a social objective to enhance existing bowling communities and to position bowls clubs and the sport in the wider community.

Bowls Victoria has a responsibility to govern the game as directed by World Bowls and Bowls Australia, to run events at state level and also to run Pennant competition in the Metro region. We have representative teams at senior, under-25, under-18, over-60 and bowlers arm levels.
They also have a responsibility to promote the sport in the community at large and in minorities. Clubs can lean on Bowls Victoria for support in a range of areas.

There are over 520 bowls clubs across Victoria, with 50,000 plus members affiliated with Bowls Victoria.

History

Whilst the game of bowls was well established in Victoria from the 1860s, there was no governing association for the sport until 1880.  As early as  July 4, 1867, the six clubs in existence at the time, including the oldest Melbourne Bowling Club, met and agreed to a set of rules for the game to be used in inter club matches.  Whilst the clubs had regular competition, it was not until 1880, when a Victorian side visited New South Wales, that the Victorian Bowling Association was founded on 23 July 1880.
The sport in Victoria continued to be governed by its own set of laws, which differed to those applied in other parts of the country, particularly New South Wales, and Western Australia.  It was not until after the formation of the Australian Bowling Council on September 22, 1911, that uniform rules across the states began to be consolidated into a single set of rules.

In 1947, the association was granted "Royal" status, and became known as the Royal Victorian Bowling Association (RVBA).

Following the unification of the RVBA with the Victorian Ladies Bowling Association (VLBA) (see Women's bowls in Australia) in December 2009, the organisation was renamed to become Bowls Victoria.

Structure

Bowls Victoria is governed by a Board of Directors, including a president, deputy president, finance director and 5 ordinary directors.

The organisation coverage across metropolitan and regional Victoria is structured on a regional and divisional basis:

Bendigo Campaspe Bowls Region
Bendigo District Bowls Division
Campaspe Valley Bowls Division
Central Goulburn Murray Bowls Region
Murray Bowls Division
Central Bowls Division
Goulburn Valley Bowls Division
Central Victoria Bowls Region
BallaratDistrict Bowls Division
Central Highlands Bowls Division
Goldfields Bowls Division
Eastern Ranges Bowls Region
Geelong Bowls Region
Gippsland Bowls Region
East Gippsland Bowls Division
North Gippsland Bowls Division
Metro West Bowls Region
Murray Malley Bowls Region
Murray Valley Bowls Division
Northern District Bowls Division
Bowls Sunraysia Division
Tyrrell Bowls Division
Northern Gateway Bowls Region
Ovens & Murray Bowls Region
Peninsula Casey Bowls Region
Flinders Bowls Division
Peninsula Bowls Division
Sandbelt Bowls Region
Strzelecki Bowls Region
West Gippsland Bowls Division
South Gippsland Bowls Division
West Coast Bowls Region
Corangamite Bowls Division
Far Western Bowls Division
Western District Bowls Division
Wimmera Bowls Region
Grampians Bowls Division
North Central Bowls Division
North Wimmera Bowls Division
Wimmera Bowls Division
Yarra Bowls Region

See also
 Bowls Australia

References

External links
 
 
 

Bowls in Australia
Sports governing bodies in Victoria (Australia)
Sports leagues established in 1880
1880 establishments in Australia
Organisations based in Australia with royal patronage
Bowling organizations
Organisations based in Melbourne